Tan Shuping (born 21 January 1978) is a Chinese former diver. She competed at the 1992 Summer Olympics and the 1996 Summer Olympics.

References

External links
 

1978 births
Living people
Chinese female divers
Olympic divers of China
Divers at the 1992 Summer Olympics
Divers at the 1996 Summer Olympics
Place of birth missing (living people)
Asian Games medalists in diving
Divers at the 1994 Asian Games
Asian Games gold medalists for China
Medalists at the 1994 Asian Games
20th-century Chinese women